Jorge Maya Dodera (born 5 May 1944) is a Uruguayan basketball player. He competed in the men's tournament at the 1964 Summer Olympics.

References

External links

1944 births
Living people
Uruguayan men's basketball players
Olympic basketball players of Uruguay
Basketball players at the 1964 Summer Olympics
Place of birth missing (living people)